Odontosia carmelita, the scarce prominent, is a moth of the family Notodontidae. The species was first described by Eugenius Johann Christoph Esper in 1798. It is found in central Europe, ranging to Ireland and Finland in the north and Russia in the east.

The wingspan is 32–42 mm. The wing colour is graded in various shades of reddish brown or purplish grey. The forewings have faint points of paler colour (grey scales) and there is a distinct creamy patch on the front margin. The forewings are scalloped. The hindwing is paler with a dark brown anal patch. The thorax and body are dark brown.

The moths are on wing from March to May depending on the location.

The larvae feed on Betula and Alnus species.

References

Further reading
South R. (1907) The Moths of the British Isles, (First Series), Frederick Warne & Co. Ltd., London & NY: 359 pp. online

External links

Fauna Europaea
Lepiforum e.V.

Notodontidae
Moths of Europe
Moths described in 1798
Taxa named by Eugenius Johann Christoph Esper